Ivan Lebanov (born 10 December 1957) was a Bulgarian skier who competed from the 1970s to 1985.

He earned a bronze medal in the 30 km event at the 1980 Winter Olympics in Lake Placid, New York, becoming the first Bulgarian to win a Winter Olympic medal.

Lebanov's best World Cup finish was a 10th place in a 15 km event in Switzerland in 1982.

External links
 
 
 
 

1957 births
Living people
Bulgarian male cross-country skiers
People from Bansko
Olympic cross-country skiers of Bulgaria
Cross-country skiers at the 1976 Winter Olympics
Cross-country skiers at the 1980 Winter Olympics
Olympic bronze medalists for Bulgaria
Olympic medalists in cross-country skiing
Macedonian Bulgarians
Medalists at the 1980 Winter Olympics
Universiade medalists in cross-country skiing
Universiade gold medalists for Bulgaria
Universiade silver medalists for Bulgaria
Competitors at the 1978 Winter Universiade
Competitors at the 1981 Winter Universiade
Competitors at the 1983 Winter Universiade
Sportspeople from Blagoevgrad Province
20th-century Bulgarian people